The Myanmar national women's cricket team is the team that represents Myanmar in international women's cricket. They made their international debut in the Thailand's World T20 smash in Thailand in January 2019. 

In April 2018, the International Cricket Council (ICC) granted full Women's Twenty20 International (WT20I) status to all its members. Therefore, all Twenty20 matches played between Myanmar women and other ICC members after 1 July 2018 will be a full WT20I.

Records and statistics 

International Match Summary — Myanmar Women
 
Last Updated 25 April 2019

Twenty20 International 

 Highest team total: 135/7 v. Singapore on 19 April 2019 at Indian Association Ground, Singapore.  
 Highest individual score: 57, Khin Myat v. Singapore on 19 April 2019 at Indian Association Ground, Singapore.   
 Best individual bowling figures: 6/10, Zon Lin v. Indonesia on 13 January 2019 at Asian Institute of Technology Ground, Bangkok.   

Most T20I runs for Myanmar Women

Most T20I wickets for Myanmar Women

T20I record versus other nations

Records complete to WT20I #620. Last updated 25 April 2019.

See also
 List of Myanmar women Twenty20 International cricketers

References

Women's
W
M